The Exoteliospora is a monotypic genus of smut fungi in the family Melanopsichiaceae containing the single species Exoteliospora osmundae.

References

External links

Ustilaginomycotina
Monotypic Basidiomycota genera
Taxa named by Franz Oberwinkler
Taxa described in 1999